Rogét Lutfi Chahayed (born May 31, 1988) is a Grammy-nominated American record producer and songwriter who Billboard has called "one of hip-hop and pop's most dependable hit machines." A conservatory-trained pianist who became a producer under the wing of mentor Dr. Dre, he has produced records and written songs for Drake, Jennifer Lopez, Travis Scott, Jack Harlow, Doja Cat, Khalid, Big Sean, ZAYN, Calvin Harris, Lil Yachty, Miguel, Kesha, Halsey, and BTS, among others. He was named one of XXL's hip-hop producers of the year three times, named one of Variety's Hitmakers twice, and was nominated for Producer of the Year, Non-Classical at the 64th Annual Grammy Awards in 2022. Genius named him the top producer of the year in 2022.

Chahayed co-produced and co-wrote DRAM's "Broccoli," Halsey's "Bad at Love", Travis Scott's "Sicko Mode," Drake's "Laugh Now Cry Later," Doja Cat's "Kiss Me More," Jack Harlow's "First Class" and Doja Cat's "Vegas"; he also co-wrote Miguel's "Sky Walker."

Early life and education
Chahayed was born and raised in the West Hills suburb of Los Angeles in a musical family. His parents are both immigrants to the United States: his father emigrated from Syria and his mother is from Buenos Aires. His sisters Andrea and Juliana Chahayed are both musicians with whom he continues to collaborate. He began playing the piano at seven years old.

Chahayed is classically trained, having attended the San Francisco Conservatory of Music on a scholarship, studying under professor Yoshikazu Nagai. He graduated in 2010 with a degree in piano performance. He studied jazz in Los Angeles with pianists Adam Benjamin and Gary Fukushima. He initially became interested in hip hop production during college.

Career
Chahayed began his career in 2010 in Los Angeles working as a music director, composer, session musician, and piano teacher. As a pianist, he played at venues across Los Angeles and collaborated with guitarist Wesley Singerman on the jazz collective Los Angeles Illharmonic. During this period he worked with artists including Ron Aniello, Mocky, Jeffrey Steele, Matt Corby, Rita Wilson, and Kurupt.

In 2013, he connected with rapper Stat Quo who introduced him to his fellow Aftermath Entertainment affiliate producer Mel-Man, who became a mentor for Chahayed; through this connection, he began playing keyboards and producing for Dr. Dre. He also worked with artists including Matthew Koma, Kendrick Lamar, Taz Arnold, Miguel Atwood-Ferguson, and Wanting Qu.

In 2016, he had his breakout with the release of DRAM's "Broccoli" which he co-produced. The song was nominated for a Grammy Award and is a 7× Platinum record. Chahayed has worked with Travis Scott, DRAM, Hit Boy, Miguel, Solange Knowles, Halsey, Lil Yachty, CL, Bruno Mars, ScHoolboy Q, PARTYNEXTDOOR, Jason Derulo, A$AP Rocky, A$AP Ferg, Big Krit, Juan Gabriel, Doja Cat, J Balvin, Jon Connor, Calvin Harris, Moses Sumney, Travis Mills, Kendrick Lamar and Dr. Dre.

His hits also include Doja Cat's platinum-selling "Ain't Shit," Louis The Child and Wafia's Platinum-selling single "Better Not," MAX's Platinum-selling "Love Me Less" featuring Quinn XCII, and Joji's Gold-selling "CAN'T GET OVER YOU" featuring Clams Casino.

Production discography

Awards and nominations 
Selected awards

References 

Living people
American male songwriters
American hip hop record producers
1988 births
American male pianists
21st-century American pianists
21st-century American male musicians
American people of Syrian descent
American people of Argentine descent